Marie Lindgren (born 26 March 1970) is a Swedish freestyle skier and Olympic medalist. She received a silver medal at the 1994 Winter Olympics in Lillehammer, in aerials. 

She finished 2nd in the aerials (demonstration event) at the 1992 Winter Olympics in Albertville.

References

1970 births
Living people
Swedish female freestyle skiers
Olympic freestyle skiers of Sweden
Freestyle skiers at the 1994 Winter Olympics
Olympic silver medalists for Sweden
Olympic medalists in freestyle skiing
Medalists at the 1994 Winter Olympics
Freestyle skiers at the 1992 Winter Olympics